Robert Engelman is an American author and former journalist who writes about the environment and population and serves as Senior Fellow at the Worldwatch Institute. He was President of the Institute from 2011 until 2014. His book More: Population, Nature, and What Women Want was published in 2008.

Robert Engelman, the writer, is not to be confused with the film and television producer of the same name.

Early life and education
Engelman received his bachelor of arts degree from the University of Chicago and his masters of science from the Columbia University Graduate School of Journalism, which in 1976 awarded him a Pulitzer Traveling Fellowship.

Journalism career
Engelman began his career as a newspaper reporter, working for the Associated Press out of Mexico City in 1977. He subsequently worked for the Kansas City Times in Kansas City and Washington, D.C., and then for the (Denver) Rocky Mountain News as its Washington correspondent. He later joined the national reporting staff of Scripps Howard News Service, eventually serving as its science, health and environment correspondent.

Population advocacy career
In 1992 Engelman left journalism and founded a research program on population and the environment at the Population Crisis Committee, a Washington-based research and advocacy non-profit that subsequently changed its name to Population Action International (PAI). He later became vice president for research at PAI. In 1997, he was among the founders of the Center for a New American Dream and served until 2007 as chair of its board of directors. While at PAI Engelman and colleagues published reports on the linkages of population dynamics and environmental change, one of them published in the journal Nature in 2000. In 2002 and 2003, Engelman served on the faculty of Yale University as a visiting lecturer on population and the environment.

In 2007, Engelman joined the staff of the Worldwatch Institute as vice president for programs, where he has continued his research and writing on population and the environment. He is one of several authors and one of three project directors of the Institute's signature publication The State of the World 2009: Into a Warming World and co-directs Worldwatch's fundraising from foundations and governments. He was President of the Institute from 2011 to 2013 and is now a senior fellow.

Books
More: Population, Nature, and What Women Want 2010, Island Press, 
Population, Climate Change, and Women's Lives, 2010, Kindle Edition

Bibliography
 "Sealing the Deal to Save the Climate", State of the World 2009: Into a Warming World, Norton, 2009, 
 More: Population, Nature, and What Women Want, Island Press, 2008,

Articles
 Population and Sustainability: Can We Avoid Limiting the Number of People? June 2009, Scientific American
 Earth Hour? Why Not "Earth Until-We-Figure-This-Out?" March 2009, Huffington Post

References

External links
 The Worldwatch Institute 
 More: Population, Nature, and What Women Want
 State of the World 2011 
 http://e360.yale.edu/author/Robert_Engelman/113/
 http://www.theglobalist.com/contributors/robert-engelman/

Living people
University of Chicago alumni
Columbia University Graduate School of Journalism alumni
Kansas City Times people
Rocky Mountain News people
Year of birth missing (living people)